Anesthesia is Fun People's debut album, first released on Frost Bite in 1995 and then edited by Ugly Records.

Track listing
"Ánimo"
"Estoy (a tu lado)"
"Submerge your senses into the black"
"Marionetas"
"Runaway"
"Hunt"
"1978 (Camps days)"
"Dear"
"Anabelle"
"FMI"
"Boicot antinatural"
"Mantiene tu espíritu con humor"
"Bad influence"
"Break your obsessions"
"Vivisección"
"Distinto"
"Jailed"
"Give you help"
"Mi vida"
"Lemon pie"
"Eres ciego"
"Shaggy mi querido amigo en peligro"
"Searching my lucky again"
"About me"
"Helter skelter"
"NY city clon"
"Sin color"
"Cada vez más"
"When the sun"
"Valor interior"
"Rain"
Recorded and Mixed by Marcelo Depetro.

Fun People albums